Shahul Rayyan Bin Mohammad Redzuan (born 12 February 1995) is a Singaporean footballer currently playing as a goalkeeper for Warriors of the Singapore Premier League.

Career statistics

Club

Notes

References

1995 births
Living people
Singaporean footballers
Association football goalkeepers
Singapore Premier League players
Young Lions FC players
Warriors FC players
Albirex Niigata Singapore FC players